William Howard Annan (December 14, 1850 – unknown) was an American professional baseball umpire. Annan umpired one National Association game in 1873, between the Brooklyn Atlantics and the Boston Red Stockings (today's Atlanta Braves).

Annan was also a minor league shortstop, played for Harvard University, and earned a law degree there. He was a lawyer in Baltimore from 1880 to 1885, studied at the University of Edinburgh, then moved to London and later New York City. He disappeared in 1898.

References

External links

1850 births
Major League Baseball umpires
Sportspeople from Kentucky
Year of death unknown
19th-century baseball umpires
Harvard Law School alumni
American expatriates in England